Chauhan, a name derived from the historical Chahamanas, is a clan name associated with the various ruling Rajput families in Rajasthan during the Medieval Indian eras .

Subclans

Khichi, Hada, Songara, Bhadauria, Devda etc. are the branches or  subclans of Chauhan Rajputs.

Origin 

The word Chauhan is the vernacular form of the Sanskrit term Chahamana (IAST: Cāhamāna). Several Chauhan inscriptions name a legendary hero called Chahamana as their ancestor, but none of them state the period in which he lived.

The earliest extant inscription that describes the origin of the Chauhans is the 1119 CE Sevadi inscription of Ratnapala, a ruler of the Naddula Chahamana dynasty. According to this inscription, the ancestor of the Chahamanas was born from the eye of Indra.

The 1170 CE Bijolia rock inscription of the Shakambhari Chahamana king Someshvara states that his ancestor Samantaraja was born at Ahichchhatrapura (possibly modern Nagaur) in the gotra of sage Vatsa. The 1262 CE Sundha hill inscription of the Jalor Chahamana king Chachiga-deva states that the dynasty's ancestor Chahamana was "a source of joy" to the Vatsa. The 1320 Mount Abu (Achaleshwar temple) inscription of the Deora Chauhan ruler Lumbha states that Vatsa created the Chahamanas as a new lineage of warriors, after the solar dynasty and the lunar dynasty had ceased to exist.

The Ajmer inscription of the Shakambhari Chahamana ruler Vigraharaja IV (–64 CE) claims that Chahamana belonged to the solar dynasty, descending from Ikshavaku and Rama. The 12th-century Prithviraja Vijaya mahakavya, composed by Prithviraja III's court poet Jayanaka, also claims a solar dynasty origin for the ruling dynasty. According to this text, Chahamana came to earth from Arkamandal (the orbit of the sun).

The 15th-century Hammira Mahakavya of Nayachandra Suri, which describes the life of the Ranthambore branch ruler Hammira, gives the following account: Once Brahma was wandering in search of an auspicious place to conduct a ritual sacrifice. He ultimately chose the place where a lotus from his hand fell; this place came to be known as Pushkara. Brahma wanted to protect his sacrificial ceremony against interference from danavas (miscreant beings). Therefore, he remembered the Sun, and a hero came into being from the sun's orb. This hero was Chohan, the ancestor of the Hammira's dynasty. The earliest extant recension of Prithviraj Raso of Chand Bardai, dated to 15th or 16th century, states that the first Chauhan king – Manikya Rai – was born from Brahma's sacrifice. The 16th-century Surjana-Charita, composed by the Bengali poet Chandra Shekhara under patronage of the Ranthambore ruler Rao Surjana, contains a similar account. It states that Brahma created the first Chahamana from the Sun's disc during a sacrificial ceremony at Pushkara.

Despite these earlier myths, it was the Agnivanshi (or Agnikula) myth that became most popular among the Chauhans and other Rajput clans. According to this myth, some of the Rajput clans originated from Agni, in a sacrificial fire pit. This legend was probably invented by the 10th-century Paramara court poet Padmagupta, whose Nava-sahasanka-charita mentions only the Paramaras as fire-born. The inclusion of Chauhans in the Agnivanshi myth can be traced back to the later recensions of Prithviraj Raso. In this version of the legend, once Vashistha and other great sages begin a major sacrificial ceremony on Mount Abu. The ritual was interrupted by miscreant daityas (demons). To get rid of these demons, Vashistha created progenitors of three Rajput dynasties from the sacrificial fire pit. These were Parihar (Pratiharas), Chaluk (Chaulukya or Solanki), and Parmar (Paramara). These heroes were unable to defeat the demons. So, the sages prayed again, and this time a fourth warrior appeared: Chahuvana (Chauhan). This fourth hero slayed the demons.

The earliest available copies of Prithviraj Raso do not mention the Agnivanshi legend. It is possible that the 16th-century bards came up with the legend to foster Rajput unity against the Mughal emperor Akbar. Adaptions of the Prithviraj Raso occur in several later works. The Hammira Raso (1728 CE) by Jodharaja, a court poet of prince Chandrabhana of Neemrana, states that once the Kshatriyas (warriors) became extinct. So, the great sages assembled at Mount Abu and created three heroes. When these three heroes could not defeat the demons, they created Chahuvanaji. A slight variation occurs in the writings of Surya Malla Mishrana, the court poet of Bundi. In this version, the various gods create the four heroes on Vashistha's request. According to the bardic tale of the Khichi clan of Chauhans, the Parwar (Paramara) was born from Shiva's essence; the Solankhi (Solanki) or Chaluk Rao (Chalukya) was born from Brahma's essence; the Pariyar (Parihar) was born from Devi's essence; and the Chahuvan (Chauhan) was born from Agni, the fire.

History 

The Chauhans were historically a powerful group in the region now known as Rajasthan. For around 400 years from the 7th century CE their strength in Sambhar was a threat to the power-base of the Guhilots in the south-west of the area, as also was the strength of their fellow Agnivanshi clans. They suffered a set-back in 1192 when their leader, Prithviraj Chauhan, was defeated at the Second Battle of Tarain but this did not signify their demise.  The kingdom broke into the Satyapura and Devda branches after the invasion of Qutbu l-Din Aibak in 1197. The 13th and 14th centuries saw the struggle between the Chauhan Rajputs and the Delhi Sultanate to control the strategic areas of Delhi, Punjab and Gujarat.

The earliest Chauhan inscription is a copper-plate inscription found at Hansot.

Dynasties and states 

The ruling dynasties belonging to the Chauhan clan included:

 Chahamanas of Shakambhari (Chauhans of Ajmer)
 Chahamanas of Naddula (Chauhans of Nadol)
 Chahamanas of Lata
 Chahamanas of Dholpur
 Chahamanas of Partabgarh
 Chahamanas of Jalor (Chauhans of Jalore); branched off from the Chahamanas of Naddula
  Chauhans of Raghogarh State; branched off from the Chahmanas of Shakamabhari and Gagron
 Chahamanas of Sirohi State; branched off from the Chahamanas of Naddula
 Chahamanas of Ranastambhapura (Chauhans of Ranthambore); branched off from the Chahamanas of Shakambhari
 Chauhans of Bundi State branched off from the Chahmanas of Shakamabhari
 Chauhans of Kota State; branched off from the Chahamanas of Shakamabhari (later Bundi)
 Chauhans of Patna State; branched off from the Chuahans of Garh Sambhar (Mainpuri)
 Chauhans of Tulsipur State
 Chuahans of Vav; branched off from the Chahmanas from Naddula
 Chauhans of Dhami State; branched off from the Chahmanas from Delhi
 Chauhans of Sambalpur State
 Chauhans of Sonepur State
 Chauhans of Changbhakar
 Chauhans of Koriya

References

Citations

Bibliography 

 
 
 
 
 

Indian surnames
Rajput clans
Gurjar clans
Agnivansha